Alireza Akhondi (born September 20, 1980 in Isfahan, Iran) is a Swedish politician for the Center Party. He is a member of parliament since 2018, elected for Stockholm County's constituency.

In the Riksdag, he is a deputy in the Labor Market Committee, the Civil Affairs Committee and the Tax Committee.

Akhondi was born in Iran and is of Iranian descent.

References

Members of the Riksdag from the Centre Party (Sweden)
21st-century Swedish politicians
1980 births
Living people
Members of the Riksdag 2018–2022
Members of the Riksdag 2022–2026

Swedish politicians of Iranian descent